Up for Days is the eighth mixtape by Palestinian-Canadian hip hop recording artist Belly. It is his first project release under the record labels Roc Nation and XO, it was released on May 7, 2015. The mixtape features guest appearances from The Weeknd, Juelz Santana, French Montana and Travis Scott. It was supported by the singles "Might Not", which features fellow Canadian singer-songwriter The Weeknd and "No Option".

Background 
This is Belly's first release since his five year hiatus. Upon releasing the project, Belly stated "This is the introduction for me: it's not a new chapter in my story, it's a completely new book."

Reception 
Rose Lilah of HotNewHipHip praised the project, stating that during his hiatus, he was "perfecting and curating his latest body of work, Up For Days, and it definitely shows".

Track listing 
Credits were adapted from Tidal.

Notes
  signifies a co-producer

References

2015 mixtape albums